The Swedish Confederation of Professional Associations (SACO) is a confederation of 26 independent professional associations in Sweden. It gathers some 940,000 members, all of whom are academics or graduate professionals with a university or college degree. The members include economists, lawyers, architects, graduate engineers, doctors, scientists, teachers and many others. A growing share of Swedish union members are affiliated to a Saco union: 1% in 1950 and 18% in 2018 (pensioners and students excluded).

The organisation does not form affiliations with political parties.

Associations
Association of Architects (Sveriges Arkitekter)
Association of Graduate Engineers (Sveriges Ingenjörer)
Association of Graduates in Business Administration and Economics (Civilekonomerna)
Association of Graduates in Documentation, Information and Culture (DIK-förbundet)
Association of Graduates in Forestry (Skogsakademikerna)
Association of Graduates in Law, Economics and Personnel Management (Jusek)
Swedish Association of Graduates in Public Administration and Social Work (Akademikerförbundet SSR)
Association of Head Teachers and Directors of Education (Sveriges Skolledarförbund)
Association of Military Officers (Officersförbundet)
Association of Military Officers in the Reserve (Sveriges Reservofficersförbund)
Association of Occupational Therapists (Förbundet Sveriges Arbetsterapeuter)
Association of Registered Physiotherapists (Legitimerade sjukgymnasters Riksförbund)
Association of Scientists (Naturvetarna)
Association of University Teachers (Sveriges Universitetslärarförbund)
Association of Church of Sweden Employees (Kyrkans Akademikerförbund)
National Union of Teachers in Sweden (Lärarnas Riksförbund)
SRAT (associations of professional employees)
SACO Association for Traffic and Railway (SACO-förbundet Trafik och Järnväg)
Swedish Dental Association (Sveriges Tandläkarförbund)
Swedish Medical Association (Sveriges Läkarförbund)
Swedish Pharmaceutical Association (Sveriges Farmacevtförbund)
Swedish Psychological Association (Sveriges Psykologförbund)
Swedish Ship Officers' Association (Sveriges Fartygsbefälsförening)
Swedish Veterinary Association (Sveriges Veterinärförbund)

Footnotes

Further reading
 Anders Kjellberg (2017) The Membership Development of Swedish Trade Unions and Union Confederations Since the End of the Nineteenth Century (Studies in Social Policy, Industrial Relations, Working Life and Mobility). Research Reports 2017:2 (updated 2018). Lund: Department of Sociology, Lund University

See also 

Swedish Federation of Salaried Employees in Industry and Services (PTK)
Swedish Public Employees' Negotiation Council (OFR)
Swedish Confederation of Professional Employees (TCO)

External links
 

Labour movement in Sweden
Professional associations based in Sweden
National trade union centers of Sweden
International Trade Union Confederation
European Trade Union Confederation
Trade unions established in 1947
1947 establishments in Sweden
Organizations based in Stockholm